The Nine Trey Gangster Bloods or Nine Trey Gangsta Bloods (NTG) (also referred to as Bentley's or Billionaires) are a violent set of the United Blood Nation street gang, which is itself a set of the Bloods gang. The gang operates on the East Coast of the United States.

History
The gang was established in 1993 at the Rikers Island jail complex in New York City. The gang initially sold various narcotics including heroin, crack cocaine and PCP throughout Harlem. They based their drug selling business in uninhabited buildings in the vicinity of Lenox Avenue. Disadvantaged people including the homeless, prostitutes and children were allegedly used to sell the narcotics for the gang.

The gang has operated in the U.S. state of Virginia and other states. It has allegedly been engaged in the sex trafficking of women and racketeering in Virginia, New York, North Carolina, Baltimore, New Jersey and other areas. The gang was also allegedly involved in the distribution of illegal drugs, including heroin, cocaine, crack, ecstasy, marijuana and prescription painkillers in these areas. Further allegations include dealing in counterfeit U.S. currency and using counterfeit currency to "finance wholesale drug purchases".

The gang has been investigated by the U.S. FBI, DEA, and ATF as well as various other gang task forces in the United States.

Arrests and prosecution

2006

In July 2006, approximately 50 members of the gang were arrested as an outcome of a significant police operation called "Operation Nine Connect". After these initial arrests, at least another 30 arrests were made.

2011

In June 2011, Robert "Snoop" Christie pleaded guilty to a weapons charge in a plea bargain. This conviction received a five-year prison sentence, which was added on to an eight-year sentence Christie was already serving for a previous weapon and drug conviction.

2013

In March 2013, eight alleged gang members and associates appeared in federal court facing charges based on a "major crack cocaine investigation". Specific details of the case were sealed under court order at that time because an ongoing investigation was being conducted by the FBI and Drug Enforcement Administration, and it was stated that the release of information could have had an "adverse result" upon the investigation.

2014

In February 2014, the U.S. Attorney's Office for the Eastern District of Virginia announced that following a trial that began on February 11, 2014, three members of the gang, including Thaddaeus Snow, were convicted by a federal jury for racketeering, robbery, cocaine distribution, sex trafficking and firearms-related offenses. Upon this conviction, 24 individuals named in the initial September 2013 indictment were also subsequently convicted.

2016

In November 2016, four members of the Nine Trey Gangsters were indicted for their alleged involvement in 10 shootings that left 5 dead during December 2015 in Norfolk, Virginia.

2018–2019

In November 2018, rapper 6ix9ine (birth name Daniel Hernandez) and four members of the Nine Trey Gangsters were arrested by the Homeland Security Investigations gang unit along with the Bureau of Alcohol, Tobacco, Firearms and Explosives, and charged with racketeering related to operating a criminal enterprise, conspiracy to murder, robbery, extortion, and drug distribution.

See also

 Gangs in the United States
 List of gangs in the United States
 Trial of Nine Trey Gangsters
 United Blood Nation
 Shotti
 Tekashi69

References

Organizations established in 1993
1993 establishments in New York City
 
Bloods sets
Gangs in Baltimore
Gangs in New Jersey
Gangs in New York City
Gangs in North Carolina
Gangs in Virginia
African-American history in New York City